The Venerable  Sidney Lampard Clarke  MA, BSc was an eminent Anglican Chaplain.

He was born on 15 January 1871  in Derby, Derbyshire, England and educated at the Universities of St Andrews and London. He was ordained Deacon in 1899 and Priest a year later. After a curacy at St. Mary's, Horncastle he was a naval chaplain and instructor from 1901 until 1918 when he joined the fledgling RAF Chaplaincy Service. He was at the Halton Camp from 1919 to 1930 when he became  Archdeacon (Chaplain-in-Chief) of the service. Upon military retirement he was Vicar of Cranwell from 1934 to 1938.

An Honorary Chaplain to the King he died on 13 November 1945.

Notes and references

1871 births
1945 deaths
People from Derby
People from Eccles, Greater Manchester
Alumni of the University of St Andrews
Alumni of the University of London
Royal Navy chaplains
Military personnel from Derbyshire
Honorary Chaplains to the King
Royal Air Force Chaplains-in-Chief
World War I chaplains